Park Kultury may refer to:

Russian rapid transit
 Park Kultury (Koltsevaya Line), a station of the Moscow Metro
 Park Kultury (Sokolnicheskaya Line), a station of the Moscow Metro
 Park Kultury (Nizhny Novgorod Metro)
 Park Kultury (Volgograd Metro)
 Krestovsky Ostrov (Saint Petersburg Metro), called "Park Kultury" while in project

Other
 Gorky Park (Moscow)
 Silesian Culture and Recreation Park, a park in Poland